Paul Rasamimanana (born 11 January 1958) is a Malagasy boxer. He competed at the 1980 Summer Olympics and the 1984 Summer Olympics. At the 1984 Summer Olympics, he lost to Michael Hughes of Great Britain.

References

1958 births
Living people
Malagasy male boxers
Olympic boxers of Madagascar
Boxers at the 1980 Summer Olympics
Boxers at the 1984 Summer Olympics
Place of birth missing (living people)
Welterweight boxers